The following outline provides an overview of, and topical guide to, the Kingdom of Norway.

Norway is a sovereign constitutional monarchy, located principally in the western part of Scandinavia in Northern Europe. The country has land borders with Sweden, Finland, and Russia, while the United Kingdom and the Faroe Islands lie to its west across the North Sea and Denmark to its south across the Skagerrak strait. The country's long and glaciated Atlantic coastline is deeply indented by fjords, rising precipitously to high plateaux.

Norway also includes the Arctic island territories of Svalbard and Jan Mayen. Norwegian sovereignty over Svalbard is based upon the Spitsbergen Treaty, but that treaty does not apply to Jan Mayen. Bouvet Island in the South Atlantic Ocean and Peter I Island and Queen Maud Land in Antarctica are external dependencies, but those three entities do not form part of the kingdom.

Since World War II, Norway has experienced rapid economic growth, and is now amongst the wealthiest countries in the world. Norway is the world's third largest oil exporter after Russia and Saudi Arabia and the petroleum industry accounts for around a quarter of GDP. It has also rich resources of gas fields, hydropower, fish, forests, and minerals. Norway was the second largest exporter of seafood (in value, after China) in 2006. Other main industries include food processing, shipbuilding, metals, chemicals, mining and pulp and paper products. Norway has a Scandinavian welfare system and the largest capital reserve per capita of any nation.

Norway was ranked highest of all countries in human development from 2001 to 2006, and came second in 2007 (to fellow Nordic country Iceland). It also rated the most peaceful country in the world in a 2007 survey by Global Peace Index. It is a founding member of NATO.

General reference 

 Pronunciation: Norwegian phonology
 Common English country name:  Norway
 Official English country name:  The Kingdom of Norway
 Common endonym(s): Norge (Bokmål), Noreg (Nynorsk), Norga (Northern Sami), Vuodna (Lule Sami) or Nöörje (Southern Sami)
 Official endonym(s): Kongeriket Norge (Bokmål), Kongeriket Noreg (Nynorsk), Norgga gonagasriika  (Northern Sami), Vuona gånågisrijkka  (Lule Sami) or Nöörjen gånkarïjhke (Southern Sami)
 Adjectival(s): Norwegian
 Demonym(s): Norwegian(s)
 Etymology: Name of Norway
 ISO country codes:  NO, NOR, 578
 ISO region codes:  See ISO 3166-2:NO
 Internet country code top-level domain:  .no

Geography of Norway 

Geography of Norway
 Norway is: a Nordic country
 Location:
 Northern Hemisphere and Eastern Hemisphere
 Eurasia
 Europe
 Northern Europe
 Scandinavia
 Time zone:  Central European Time (UTC+01), Central European Summer Time (UTC+02)
 Extreme points of Norway
 High:  Galdhøpiggen 
 Low:  Norwegian Sea 0 m
 Land boundaries:  2,542 km
 1,619 km
 727 km
 196 km
 Coastline:  83,281 km
 Population of Norway: 5,367,580

 Area of Norway: 385,252 km2
 Atlas of Norway

Environment of Norway 

 Climate of Norway
 Festningen Geotope Protected Area
 Renewable energy in Norway
 Geology of Norway
 Protected areas of Norway
 Biosphere reserves in Norway
 National parks of Norway
 Wildlife of Norway
 Fauna of Norway
 Birds of Norway
 Mammals of Norway

Natural geographic features of Norway 

 Fjords of Norway
 Glaciers of Norway
 Islands of Norway
 Lakes of Norway
 Mountains of Norway
 Volcanoes in Norway
 Rivers of Norway
 World Heritage Sites in Norway

Regions of Norway 

Regions of Norway

Ecoregions of Norway 

List of ecoregions in Norway
 Ecoregions in Norway

Administrative divisions of Norway 

Administrative divisions of Norway
 Districts of Norway (historical)
 Counties of Norway (modern)
 Municipalities of Norway

Districts of Norway 

Districts of Norway
 List of traditional Norwegian districts

Counties of Norway 

Counties of Norway
 Capital of Norway: Oslo
 List of Norwegian counties

Municipalities of Norway 

Municipalities of Norway
 Capital of Norway: Oslo
 Cities of Norway

Demography of Norway 

Demographics of Norway

Government and politics of Norway 

Politics of Norway
 Form of government: unitary parliamentary, representative democratic constitutional monarchy
 Capital of Norway: Oslo
 Elections in Norway
 Political parties in Norway
 Taxation in Norway

Monarchy of Norway 

Monarchy of Norway
History of the Norwegian monarchy
Norwegian royal family
Family tree of Norwegian monarchs
Succession to the Norwegian throne
Haakon, Crown Prince of Norway
Princess Ingrid Alexandra of Norway
Prince Sverre Magnus of Norway
Coronations in Norway
Norwegian order of precedence
Regalia of Norway
Norwegian Crown Prince's Coronet
Queen of Norway's Crown
Royal mottos of Norwegian monarchs
Royal Police Escort
Thrones of Norway
Republicanism in Norway

Branches of the government of Norway 

Government of Norway

Executive branch of the government of Norway 
 Head of state: Harald V, King of Norway
 Head of government: Jonas Gahr Støre, Prime Minister of Norway
 Cabinet of Norway

Legislative branch of the government of Norway 

 Parliament of Norway (unicameral)

Judicial branch of the government of Norway 

Court system of Norway
 Supreme Court of Norway

Foreign relations of Norway 

Foreign relations of Norway
 Diplomatic missions in Norway
 Diplomatic missions of Norway

International organization membership 
The Kingdom of Norway  is a member of:

African Development Bank Group (AfDB) (nonregional member)
Arctic Council
Asian Development Bank (ADB) (nonregional member)
Australia Group
Bank for International Settlements (BIS)
Confederation of European Paper Industries (CEPI)
Council of Europe (CE)
Council of the Baltic Sea States (CBSS)
Euro-Atlantic Partnership Council (EAPC)
European Bank for Reconstruction and Development (EBRD)
European Free Trade Association (EFTA)
European Organization for Nuclear Research (CERN)
European Space Agency (ESA)
Food and Agriculture Organization (FAO)
Inter-American Development Bank (IADB)
International Atomic Energy Agency (IAEA)
International Bank for Reconstruction and Development (IBRD)
International Chamber of Commerce (ICC)
International Civil Aviation Organization (ICAO)
International Criminal Court (ICCt)
International Criminal Police Organization (Interpol)
International Development Association (IDA)
International Energy Agency (IEA)
International Federation of Red Cross and Red Crescent Societies (IFRCS)
International Finance Corporation (IFC)
International Fund for Agricultural Development (IFAD)
International Hydrographic Organization (IHO)
International Labour Organization (ILO)
International Maritime Organization (IMO)
International Mobile Satellite Organization (IMSO)
International Monetary Fund (IMF)
International Olympic Committee (IOC)
International Organization for Migration (IOM)
International Organization for Standardization (ISO)
International Red Cross and Red Crescent Movement (ICRM)
International Telecommunication Union (ITU)
International Telecommunications Satellite Organization (ITSO)

International Trade Union Confederation (ITUC)
Inter-Parliamentary Union (IPU)
Multilateral Investment Guarantee Agency (MIGA)
Nonaligned Movement (NAM) (guest)
Nordic Council (NC)
Nordic Investment Bank (NIB)
North Atlantic Treaty Organization (NATO)
Nuclear Energy Agency (NEA)
Nuclear Suppliers Group (NSG)
Organisation for Economic Co-operation and Development (OECD)
Organization for Security and Cooperation in Europe (OSCE)
Organisation for the Prohibition of Chemical Weapons (OPCW)
Organization of American States (OAS) (observer)
Paris Club
Permanent Court of Arbitration (PCA)
Schengen Convention
United Nations (UN)
United Nations Conference on Trade and Development (UNCTAD)
United Nations Educational, Scientific, and Cultural Organization (UNESCO)
United Nations High Commissioner for Refugees (UNHCR)
United Nations Industrial Development Organization (UNIDO)
United Nations Institute for Training and Research (UNITAR)
United Nations Interim Force in Lebanon (UNIFIL)
United Nations Mission in the Sudan (UNMIS)
United Nations Relief and Works Agency for Palestine Refugees in the Near East (UNRWA)
United Nations Truce Supervision Organization (UNTSO)
Universal Postal Union (UPU)
Western European Union (WEU) (associate)
World Customs Organization (WCO)
World Federation of Trade Unions (WFTU)
World Health Organization (WHO)
World Intellectual Property Organization (WIPO)
World Meteorological Organization (WMO)
World Tourism Organization (UNWTO)
World Trade Organization (WTO)
Zangger Committee (ZC)

Law and order in Norway 

Law of Norway
 Capital punishment in Norway
 Constitution of Norway
 Crime in Norway
 Domestic violence in Norway
 Human rights in Norway
 LGBT rights in Norway
 Freedom of religion in Norway
 Law enforcement in Norway

Military of Norway 

Military of Norway
 Command
 Commander-in-chief:
 Ministry of Defence of Norway
 Forces
 Army of Norway
 Navy of Norway
 Air Force of Norway
 Special forces of Norway
 Military history of Norway
 Military ranks of Norway

Local government in Norway 

Local government in Norway

History of Norway 

History of Norway
 Military history of Norway

Culture of Norway 

Culture of Norway
 Architecture of Norway
Vernacular architecture in Norway
 Cuisine of Norway
 Languages of Norway
 Media in Norway
 Museums in Norway
 National symbols of Norway
 Coat of arms of Norway
 Flag of Norway
 List of flags of Norway
 National anthem of Norway
 People of Norway
 List of Norwegians
 List of Norwegian architects
 List of Norwegian mathematicians
 Niels Henrik Abel
 List of things named after Niels Henrik Abel
 Abel Prize
 Carl Anton Bjerknes
 Vilhelm Bjerknes
 Bernt Michael Holmboe
 Sophus Lie
 Idun Reiten
 Atle Selberg
 Thoralf Skolem
 Carl Størmer
 List of Norwegian sportspeople
 Erling Haaland
 List of Norwegian writers
 List of Norwegian women writers
 Henrik Ibsen
 Prostitution in Norway
 Public holidays in Norway
 Religion in Norway
 Buddhism in Norway
 Christianity in Norway
 Church of Norway
 Roman Catholicism in Norway
 Pentecostalism in Norway
 Evangelical Lutheran Free Church of Norway
 Eastern Orthodoxy in Norway
 Oriental Orthodoxy in Norway
 Baptism in Norway
 Adventism in Norway
 Hinduism in Norway
 Islam in Norway
 Ahmadiyya in Norway
 Judaism in Norway
 World Heritage Sites in Norway

Art in Norway 
 Cinema of Norway
 Lists of Norwegian films
 List of Norwegian films before 1930
 List of Norwegian films of the 1930s
 List of Norwegian films of the 1940s
 List of Norwegian films of the 1950s
 List of Norwegian films of the 1960s
 List of Norwegian films of the 1970s
 List of Norwegian films of the 1980s
 List of Norwegian films of the 1990s
 List of Norwegian films of the 2000s
 List of Norwegian films of the 2010s
 List of Norwegian films of the 2020s
 Literature of Norway
 List of Norwegian writers
 Music of Norway
 List of Norwegian musicians
 Television in Norway
 List of Norwegian television series
 List of Norwegian television channels

Sports in Norway 
 Football in Norway
 Norway at the Olympics
 Rugby league in Norway

Economy and infrastructure of Norway 

Economy of Norway
 Economic rank, by nominal GDP (2007): 23rd (twenty-third)
 Agriculture in Norway
 Banking in Norway
 National Bank of Norway
 Communications in Norway
 Internet in Norway
 Companies of Norway
Currency of Norway: Krone
ISO 4217: NOK
 Energy in Norway
 Energy policy of Norway
 Oil industry in Norway
 Health care in Norway
 Mining in Norway
 Oslo Stock Exchange
 Tourism in Norway
 Transport in Norway
 Airports in Norway
 Rail transport in Norway
 Roads in Norway
 Whaling in Norway
 Water supply and sanitation in Norway

Education in Norway 

Education in Norway

See also 

Norway
Index of Norway-related articles
List of international rankings

Member states of the North Atlantic Treaty Organization
Member states of the United Nations
Outline of Europe
Outline of geography

Notes

References

External links 

 Norway.no, Norway's official portal.
 Norway.info
 Minifacts about Norway from Statistics Norway
 VisitNorway.com, official travel guide to Norway.
 
 Gymlink.no, a directory of gyms in Norway for visitors and tourists.
 Olive.no, a guide to restaurants in Norway.
 Pictures from Norway

Norway